Sevara Nishanbayeva (born 15 August 1993) is a Kazakhstani judoka.

She is the bronze medallist of the 2017 Judo Grand Prix Tashkent in the -57 kg category.

References

External links
 

1993 births
Living people
Kazakhstani female judoka
Judoka at the 2018 Asian Games
Asian Games silver medalists for Kazakhstan
Asian Games medalists in judo
Medalists at the 2018 Asian Games
21st-century Kazakhstani women